The Foundation University Medical College (FUMC) is a medical institution located in Islamabad, Pakistan.

References

External links
 Official website

Fauji Foundation
Medical colleges in Punjab, Pakistan
Universities and colleges in Rawalpindi District
Educational institutions established in 2000
2000 establishments in Pakistan